Autobody was a Brooklyn, New York based underground rock band. They released three albums on the Silly Bird label, as well as various other tapes and 7" records.

Discography
 Black Angus (1997)
 Vanilla Impressions (1997)
 Underworld d-Tales, Vol. 4 (1998)
 Autobody (1999)
 Autobody EP (2001)
 Xelp (?)
 Black Angus Vol. II (?)

Members 
 David Abel — bass, guitar, vocals
 Jim Abramson — guitar, bass, vocals
 Sheila Bosco — drums, vocals
 Eric Marc Cohen — drums, bass

All hail from (or subsequently joined) other arty post-rock/freeform acts like Caroliner, Dymaxion, Fly Ashtray, Job's Daughters, Wharton Tiers Ensemble, Flaming Fire, The Aerosols, Bare Flames, and Drumhead.

References

External links
[ Autobody on AMG]
Silly Bird Records site for Autobody
Live concert on WFMU

Musical groups from Brooklyn
Musical groups established in 1995
1995 establishments in New York City
Musical groups disestablished in 2001
2001 disestablishments in New York (state)
Avant-garde ensembles
Indie rock musical groups from New York (state)
American noise rock music groups